Prasophyllum collinum is a species of orchid endemic to South Australia. It has a single tubular leaf and up to thirty lemon-scented, greenish brown and white flowers. It is only known from the Eyre Peninsula where it grows in sparse woodland.

Description
As with others in the genus, the flowers are inverted so that the labellum is above the column rather than below it. The upturned part of the labellum is wavy or crinkled and there is a yellowish-green callus with a dark green base, in the centre of the labellum. Flowering occurs in September and October.

Taxonomy and naming
Prasophyllum collinum was first formally described in 2006 by David Jones from a specimen collected near Mount Olinthus and the description was published in Australian Orchid Research. The specific epithet (collina) is a Latin word meaning "of a hill" or "hilly", referring to the hilly terrain where this orchid is often found.

Distribution and habitat
This leek orchid grows in sparse woodland, often on the sheltered side of low hills, in central and southern parts of the Eyre Peninsula.

References

External links 
 

collinum
Flora of South Australia
Endemic orchids of Australia
Plants described in 2006